The Man in the Back Seat is a 1961 British B-movie crime film, directed by Vernon Sewell and starring Derren Nesbitt and Keith Faulkner.  The film was based on an Edgar Wallace story, and was tightly shot, with only four name-credited actors (one of whom remains silent through most of the film) and much of the action taking place in a cramped flat and the claustrophobic confines of a car at night.

Plot
Cold and vicious Tony (Nesbitt) and his more pleasant natured but easily influenced partner-in-crime Frank (Faulkner) hatch a plan to rob bookmaker Joe Carter (Harry Locke) of his takings as he leaves the local dog track.  They attack him brutally, then realise that the case containing the cash is chained to Joe's wrist.  They bundle him unconscious into the back seat of his car and they drive around trying to figure out a way to release the case.  They come up with various possible solutions, but nothing works and they end up at Frank's flat, to the horror of Frank's wife Jean (Carol White), who does not want their criminal activities to be brought to her doorstep.

They manage to free the case after Tony administers another severe beating to Joe, and decide to get rid of him by dousing him in alcohol and dumping him near the local hospital, where they assume a passer-by will find him and think he has suffered a drunken fall.  As they are about to leave the scene, Frank realises that Tony has left behind incriminating fingerprints on the whisky bottle, so they have no other option but to return to the crime scene to retrieve it. Again they are disturbed, so they go back to Tony's flat and contact a former male nurse, (Abe Barker), who, after looking at Joe a while, says he will soon be dead.  As a last resort, Tony and Frank decide to dump the body outside the dog track where the robbery took place and where there will be nothing to connect the crime to them. After Tony tricks Frank into reversing the car over Carter's still-living body upon leaving in order to blame him for the death, and exonerate himself from a capital crime, they drive through the night to Birmingham.

Frank then believes that they are being followed. Further,  increasingly paranoic, and barely out of London, he looks in the rear view mirror, and feels the terror of seeing Carter's ghostly, glaring face,  reproaching him from the back seat right behind him. In total panic, Frank drives the car off the road and down an embankment.  The crash kills Tony instantly, but Frank, seriously injured yet alive, is pulled clear by a passing police patrol.  The police confirm Tony's death. As Frank lays dying, he gasps Tony's name, but the car explodes before anything more can be done.

This was the last of twelve films including Abraham (Abe) Barker, (actor in Kidnapped (1960 film)), who died in the year of its release, April 25.,1961.

Cast
 Derren Nesbitt as Tony
 Keith Faulkner as Frank
 Carol White as Jean
 Harry Locke as Joe Carter
 Abe Barker as Charlie (Uncredited)

Critical reception
In the Radio Times, David Parkinson wrote, "the phrase'quota quickie' was synonymous with cheaply made, under-plotted films notable only for the ineptitude of the acting. It's a rare treat, therefore, to stumble across a British B with an intriguing idea that's been ingeniously executed. Director Vernon Sewell, who was responsible for some of the very worst quickies, outdoes himself with this haunting story."

References

External links 
 
 
 

1961 films
1961 crime films
British crime films
Films directed by Vernon Sewell
British black-and-white films
1960s English-language films
1960s British films